Humbert II (Italian: Umberto II), nicknamed the Fat (1065 – 19 October 1103), was Count of Savoy from 1080 until his death in 1103.  He was the son of Amadeus II of Savoy.

He was married to Gisela of Burgundy, daughter of William I, Count of Burgundy, and had seven children:

 Amadeus III of Savoy (1095-1148)
 William, Bishop of Liège
 Adelaide, (d. 1154), married to Louis VI of France
 Agnes, (d. 1127), married to Archimbald VI, lord of Bourbon
 Umberto
 Reginald
 Guy, abbey of Namur

References

1065 births
1103 deaths
11th-century Counts of Savoy
12th-century Counts of Savoy
People from Carignano
11th-century French people
12th-century French people